Yellowstone is an American neo-Western drama television series created by Taylor Sheridan and John Linson that premiered on June 20, 2018, on Paramount Network. The series stars Kevin Costner, Luke Grimes, Kelly Reilly, Wes Bentley, Cole Hauser, Kelsey Asbille, and Gil Birmingham. The series follows the conflicts along the shared borders of the Yellowstone Ranch, a large cattle ranch, the Broken Rock Indian reservation, Yellowstone National Park and land developers. The first part of the fifth season premiered on November 13, 2022, with the second part premiering in 2023.

In 2013, Sheridan began work on the series, having recently grown tired of acting and begun writing screenplays. Having lived in the rural parts of states such as Texas and Wyoming, Sheridan set the series in Montana and went about writing the first scripts in Livingston. Sheridan initially pitched the series to HBO, but the network declined. The series follows the Dutton family, owners of the largest ranch in Montana, the Yellowstone Dutton Ranch, commonly called "the Yellowstone". The plot revolves around family drama at the ranch and the bordering Broken Rock Indian Reservation, Yellowstone National Park, and developers. In May 2017, Paramount Network announced that it had greenlit its first scripted series, Yellowstone. Paramount issued a series order for a first season consisting of ten episodes. The series was set to be written, directed, and executive-produced by Sheridan.

A prequel series titled 1883 (2021–2022) was announced following a five-year deal signed by Sheridan with ViacomCBS and MTV Entertainment Group. The series focuses on a generation of the Dutton family during the Old West as they undertake the arduous journey across the country before settling the land that would become the Yellowstone Ranch. A second prequel series titled 1923 (2022–present) focuses on an intervening generation of the Dutton Family during the time of Western Expansion, Prohibition, and the Great Depression. A third planned spin-off titled Bass Reeves is in development and will focus on the life of the titular character. A fourth planned spin-off titled 6666 is also in development and is set in the present day on the Four Sixes Ranch in Texas. A further fifth spin-off titled 1944 was confirmed by Paramount in early 2023.

Premise
The series follows the Dutton family, owners of the largest ranch in Montana, the Yellowstone Dutton Ranch, commonly called "the Yellowstone". The plot revolves around family drama at the ranch and the bordering Broken Rock Indian Reservation, Yellowstone National Park, and developers.

Cast and characters

 Kevin Costner as John Dutton III, a widowed sixth-generation patriarch of the Dutton family who owns and operates the Yellowstone Dutton Ranch, the largest contiguous ranch in the United States and also serves as Montana Livestock Commissioner. As the series progresses, he is continually challenged by those seeking to take control of the ranch's land. At the beginning of the fifth season, he becomes the Governor of Montana.
 Josh Lucas portrays a young John Dutton in the 1990s. (recurring seasons 1, 5; guest season 2).
 Luke Grimes as Kayce Dutton, a former US Navy SEAL, a Livestock Agent and John and Evelyn's youngest son. He initially lives on the Broken Rock Indian Reservation with his Native American wife and son before moving to the Yellowstone Ranch.
 Rhys Alterman portrays a young Kayce Dutton in the 1990s. (guest seasons 1–2)
 Kelly Reilly as Bethany "Beth" Dutton, a financier and John and Evelyn's only daughter. Although well-educated, highly intelligent, and a master manipulator, Beth is bitter, abrasive, and emotionally unstable. She is loyal and extremely protective of her father and after an on-again, off-again relationship with Rip Wheeler, they eventually marry.
 Kylie Rogers portrays a young Beth Dutton in the 1990s. (recurring season 5; guest seasons 1–3)
 Wes Bentley as James Michael "Jamie" Dutton, an aspiring politician and John and Evelyn's adopted son. As an infant, he was adopted after his biological father murdered his mother and went to prison. Once completely loyal to his father and family, their relentless intolerance of him eventually drives him to follow his own path. He has a mutually hateful relationship with his sister, Beth, which becomes more pronounced as the series progresses. In the third season, he becomes the attorney general for Montana. With his former assistant, he has a son named after him.
 Dalton Baker portrays a young Jamie Dutton in the 1990s. (guest seasons 1–3)
 Cole Hauser as Rip Wheeler, the ranch foreman at the Yellowstone Dutton Ranch and John's right-hand man and enforcer. Rip has worked on the ranch for many years and is fiercely loyal to John. He was taken in by the Duttons as a young runaway after killing his father, who murdered his mother and brother. Rip has had an on-again, off-again relationship with Beth since they were teenagers until they eventually get married.
 Kyle Red Silverstein portrays a young Rip Wheeler in the 1990s. (recurring season 5; guest seasons 1–3).
 Kelsey Asbille as Monica Long Dutton, Kayce's Native American wife and John's daughter-in-law. She is initially a teacher at a local school on the Broken Rock Indian Reservation and later becomes a professor at Montana State University in Bozeman.
 Brecken Merrill as Tate Dutton, Kayce and Monica's son and John's only biological grandchild.
 Jefferson White as Jimmy Hurdstrom, a ranch hand at Yellowstone and an amateur bronc rider. In the fourth season, he leaves Yellowstone to join the 6666 Ranch.
 Danny Huston as Dan Jenkins (seasons 1–2), a billionaire land developer from California whose main goal is to take the Yellowstone Ranch from John and his family
 Gil Birmingham as Chief Thomas Rainwater, the chief of the Broken Rock Indian Reservation who neighbours the Yellowstone Ranch. He seeks to reclaim the land that the Yellowstone Ranch is built on from the Duttons that he believes was stolen from the Native Americans who originally inhabited it.
 Forrie J. Smith as Lloyd Pierce (season 3–present; recurring seasons 1–2), a senior ranch hand at Yellowstone who has worked with John on the Yellowstone Ranch for many years.
 Forrest Smith (guest season 2) and Forrest Wilder (recurring season 5) portray a young Lloyd Pierce in the 1990s.
 Denim Richards as Colby Mayfield (season 3–present; recurring seasons 1–2), a ranch hand at Yellowstone and Teeter's boyfriend.
 Ian Bohen as Ryan (season 4–present; recurring seasons 1–3), a ranch hand at Yellowstone and a Montana Livestock Agent.
 Ryan Bingham as Walker (season 4–present; recurring seasons 1–3), a musician and former convict recruited as a ranch hand at Yellowstone by Rip Wheeler.
 Finn Little as Carter (season 4–present), a troubled teenager and orphan who is taken in by Beth Dutton and becomes a ranch hand at Yellowstone.
 Wendy Moniz as Senator Lynelle Perry (season 5; recurring seasons 1, 3; guest seasons 2, 4), the former Governor of Montana and John's love interest. At the beginning of the fifth season, she becomes the U.S. Senator for Montana.
 Jennifer Landon as Teeter (season 5; recurring seasons 3–4), a tough-talking ranch hand from Texas and Colby's girlfriend.
 Kathryn Kelly as Emily (season 5; recurring season 4), the chief vet technician for the 6666 Ranch and Jimmy's fiancée.
 Moses Brings Plenty as Mo (season 5; recurring seasons 1–4), Chief Rainwater's personal driver and bodyguard.

Episodes

Production

Development
In 2013, Taylor Sheridan began work on the series, having recently grown tired of acting and begun writing screenplays. Having lived in the rural parts of states such as Texas and Wyoming, Sheridan set the series in Montana and went about writing the first scripts in Livingston. He initially pitched the series to HBO, but the network declined.

In May 2017, Paramount Network announced that it had greenlit its first scripted series, Yellowstone. Paramount issued a series order for a first season consisting of ten episodes. The series was set to be written, directed, and executive-produced by Sheridan. Other executive producers were to include John Linson, Art Linson, Harvey Weinstein, and David Glasser. Production companies involved with the series were set to consist of Linson Entertainment and The Weinstein Company.

In October 2017, it was announced that following reports of sexual abuse allegations against producer Harvey Weinstein, his name would be removed from the series' credits as would The Weinstein Company. In January 2018, Kevin Kay, president of Paramount Network, clarified during the annual Television Critics Association's winter press tour that Yellowstone will not have The Weinstein Company's credits or logo on them, even though that company was involved in production. He stated that their intent is to replace Weinstein Television with the company's new name in the show's credits when available. That same day, it was announced that the series would premiere on June 20, 2018.

In July 2018, it was announced that Paramount Network had renewed the series for a second season that was expected to premiere in 2019. In March 2019, it was announced that the second season would premiere on June 19, 2019. In June 2019, the series was renewed by Paramount for a third season, which premiered on June 21, 2020. In February 2020, Paramount Network renewed the series for a fourth season, ahead of the premiere of its third season. The fourth season premiered on November 7, 2021. In February 2022, Paramount Network renewed the series for a fifth season, which will be split into two installments. The fifth season premiered on November 13, 2022.

Casting
In May 2017, it was announced that Kevin Costner had been cast in the series lead role of John Dutton. In June 2017, it was reported that Luke Grimes, Cole Hauser, Wes Bentley, and Kelly Reilly had joined the main cast. In July 2017, it was announced that Kelsey Asbille had been cast in a main role. In August 2017, it was reported that Dave Annable, Gil Birmingham, and Jefferson White had been added to the main cast while Wendy Moniz, Gretchen Mol, Jill Hennessy, Patrick St. Esprit, Ian Bohen, Denim Richards, and Golden Brooks were joining the cast in a recurring capacity.

In November 2017, it was announced that Michaela Conlin and Josh Lucas had been added to the cast in recurring roles. In December 2017, it was reported that Heather Hemmens was joining the cast in a recurring capacity. In June 2018, it was announced that Barret Swatek had been cast in a recurring role. In September 2018, it was announced that Neal McDonough was joining the cast of season two in a recurring capacity. In July 2021, it was announced that Jacki Weaver, Piper Perabo, Kathryn Kelly and Finn Little were joining the cast in the fourth season. In February 2022, it was announced alongside the fifth season renewal that Jennifer Landon and Kelly were promoted to series regulars for the season.

Filming
Principal photography for the series began in August 2017 at the Chief Joseph Ranch in Darby, Montana, which stands in as the home of John Dutton. Filming also took place that month near Park City, Utah. The production used all three soundstages at the Utah Film Studios in Park City, which is a total of 45,000 square feet. The building also houses offices, editing, a wardrobe department and construction shops. By November 2017, the series had filmed in more than twenty locations in Utah, including the Salt Flats, Promontory Club, and Spanish Fork. Additionally, filming also took place at various locations in Montana. Production reportedly lasted until December 2017.

In August 2020, the series announced that filming was completely moved to Montana. An undisclosed production location was rented in Missoula, Montana. Film locations included the Community Medical Center, Ryman Street near the County Courthouse, and a diner (Ruby's Cafe) on Brooks Street in Missoula, as well as places in nearby Hamilton, Montana.

Filming for season 5 started in June 2022 in Missoula.

John Dutton's "Log Mansion"

Filming of the "log mansion" home of John Dutton is at the main house of the Chief Joseph Ranch, which is now a guest ranch just south of Darby.

The house was built between 1914 and 1917 after Cincinnati, Ohio residents William S. Ford (1866–1935) and Howard Clark Hollister (1856–1919) purchased 2,500 acres on the Bitterroot River for a vacation home and formed the Ford-Hollister Ranch.    Ford was chairman of Owens-Illinois Glass in Toledo, Ohio.  Hollister was a judge for the United States District Court for the Southern District of Ohio.  Bates & Gamble of Toledo were the architects.  The house is 5,000 square feet including a 2,200 square foot parlor.

The house has a log cabin motif and was dubbed "log mansion" by The New York Times. It has been compared in style to the Old Faithful Inn which opened in 1904 and is 294 driving miles away in Yellowstone National Park.  The Times described it as "A diverse combination of arches, gables and dormers, set off by logs placed vertically and horizontally, adds an elegance to log-home design that is seldom seen."

The complex includes 3 large barns built to house Holstein cattle.  It was claimed it was the largest dairy herd west of the Mississippi River. Ford later gave up the dairy cattle and began raising Hereford cattle.  After Ford died, his wife and daughter operated it as a guest house.  They sold it in 1952.  It went through a series of new owners who renamed it for Chief Joseph who is said to have passed through its area during the Nez Perce War. Mel Pervais, a self-made millionaire and member of the Ojibwa Nation, owned it from 1987 to 2004.

Music
The series' score was composed by Brian Tyler. He worked with musicians from the London Philharmonia Orchestra and viola, cello, and violin soloists. On August 17, 2018, the soundtrack for the first season was released by Sony Music.

Release
A teaser trailer for the series was released on February 28, 2018, with the first full trailer being released on April 26. On June 25, 2018, the series held a screening at Seriesfest, an annual international television festival, at the Red Rocks Amphitheater near Denver, Colorado. The first season was released on Blu-ray and DVD on December 4, 2018.

Streaming
NBCUniversal's Peacock acquired the U.S. streaming rights to Yellowstone in 2020, with the first two seasons debuting in July of that year. Paramount Global President and CEO Bob Bakish has since called the timing of the deal "unfortunate"; due to the show's improved reception, viewership, and popularity in its later seasons. Critics have noted that Yellowstone'''s absence from Paramount's own, similarly named streaming service, Paramount+ (in-spite of the show's spinoffs being produced for the service), in addition to current seasons available on Paramount Network's app and website primarily through TV Everywhere (requiring a paid television subscription), have caused confusion among viewers and the show's fans on social media.

Full episodes and seasons of Yellowstone are available for purchase on all major digital entertainment distribution stores in the U.S., with Amazon's Prime Video streaming new episodes in Canada the day after their U.S. broadcast on Paramount Network. Starting with the fifth season, it will be moved to Paramount+ in Canada, and the UK, and to SkyShowtime in any territories where the service is already available. As with the previous seasons in Canada, new episodes will be released the day after the U.S. airing.

After the fifth-season premiere airing, CMT started rerunning those episodes after being released on Paramount Network on Friday.

Spin-offs
 1883 

A prequel series, titled 1883 and set during the titular year, premiered on December 19, 2021, on Paramount+, and concluded after ten episodes on February 27, 2022. In February 2021, the series was announced as part of a five-year deal signed by Sheridan with ViacomCBS and MTV Entertainment Group, under its initial title Y: 1883. It focuses on a generation of the Dutton family during the Old West as they undertake the arduous journey across the country before settling the land that would become the Yellowstone Ranch. The series stars Sam Elliott as Shea Brennan, Tim McGraw as James Dutton, Faith Hill as Margaret Dutton, and Isabel May as Elsa Dutton. James is the great-great-grandfather of John Dutton III. Flashbacks of both James and Margaret Dutton are featured during the fourth season of Yellowstone.

 1923 

Another prequel series, titled 1923 and set during the titular year, was announced in February 2022 and premiered its first season on December 18, 2022, on Paramount+. Acting as a sequel to 1883, it focuses on a new generation of the Dutton family during the time of Western Expansion, Prohibition and the Great Depression, which in Montana started a decade earlier. The series stars Helen Mirren as Cara Dutton, Harrison Ford as Jacob Dutton and Brandon Sklenar as Spencer Dutton. Jacob is the older brother of James Dutton, who was featured in 1883, and is the great-great uncle of John Dutton III.

Initially titled and set in the year 1932, in June 2022 it was announced that the title and setting would be changed to 1923. The series is set to run for two seasons consisting of eight episodes each.

 Bass Reeves 

A spinoff series to 1883 titled Bass Reeves was announced in May 2022 and will consist of six episodes. The series will focus on the life of the titular character, the first black U.S. Marshal. The series will star David Oyelowo as Bass Reeves and Dennis Quaid as Sherill Lynn. By January 2023, filming for the series had begun.

 1944 
Another prequel series, titled 1944 and set during the titular year, is reportedly in development as of February 2023. It will serve as a sequel to 1923 and will be filmed in Bitterroot Valley.

 6666 
Another planned spin-off, titled 6666, is set in the present day on the Four Sixes Ranch in Texas. It will premiere on Paramount Network in 2023. The 6666 Ranch is also featured during the fourth and fifth seasons of Yellowstone.

Reception
 Critical response 
Following its premiere, the show was met with a mixed response from critics. Metacritic, which uses a weighted average, assigned the first season a score of 57 out of 100 based on 39 critics, indicating "mixed or average reviews". On the review aggregation website Rotten Tomatoes, the first season holds a 56% approval rating, with an average rating of 5.8/10 based on 52 reviews. The website's critical consensus of the first season reads, "Yellowstone proves too melodramatic to be taken seriously, diminishing the effects of the talented cast and beautiful backdrops."

The second season holds an approval rating of 89%, based on 9 reviews. The third season holds an approval rating of 100% based on reviews from 7 critics. The fourth season holds a 91% approval rating based on reviews from 11 critics. The critical consensus for that season reads, "Hitting its stride as a predictably unpredictable oat opera, Yellowstone continues to entertain with its tough-as-rawhide characters and modernized perspective on classic cowboy tropes." The fifth season earned a 90% approval rating based on 30 reviews. The critical consensus for that season reads, "Galloping into the arena of politics with a decidedly nonpartisan bent, Yellowstone'' enters uncertain territory but remains firmly in the saddle, with Kevin Costner's steadfast presence remaining an invaluable asset."

Audience 
Viewership of the series has grown with subsequent seasons. The season 3 premiere attracted 7.6 million viewers, and the season 4 premiere tallied 12.7 million viewers. The season 5 premiere garnered 12.1 million viewers. The series has attracted audiences from American conservatives and also been called a "Heartland drama" and "red state" drama, a label which Sheridan himself disputes.

Awards and nominations

References

External links
 
 

English-language television shows
2010s American drama television series
2010s Western (genre) television series
2020s American drama television series
2020s Western (genre) television series
2018 American television series debuts
Paramount Network original programming
Television series about families
Television shows about Native Americans
Television series created by Taylor Sheridan
Television shows filmed in Montana
Television shows filmed in Utah
Television shows set in Montana
Yellowstone National Park
Neo-Western television series